Jeon Bong-seong (born March 18, 1985) is a South Korean football player who played for Chunnam Dragons.

References

External links
 
 

Living people
1985 births
South Korean footballers
South Korean expatriate footballers
Jeonnam Dragons players
K League 1 players
Singapore Premier League players
Expatriate footballers in Singapore
South Korean expatriate sportspeople in Singapore
Association football goalkeepers